Eduard Drach born 1965 in Kryvyi Rih, in Dnipropetrovsk Oblast, in the Ukrainian SSR of the Soviet Union – in present-day Ukraine) is а prominent and influential composer, singer-songwriter, kobzar, and bandurist. He is an active member of the Kiev Kobzar Guild. The author of numerous songs in a variety of styles, Drach is noted in particular for his original psalms in Ukrainian historical folk style.

Drach was educated as a physician and still works as a neurologist, his career in music notwithstanding. His first instrument was the violin. He went on to become a prize-winning singer-songwriter at numerous festivals, in particular: the 1989 Chervona Ruta Festival.

An accomplished musician, his music styles include modern ballade & romance, traditional folk music, folk-rock, folk-jazz, folk avant-garde, etc. He is proficient in guitar: 6, 7, 12 str. (Mainly, 12 str), violin, keyboards, bass, mandolin, banjo, kobza, traditional bandura, husli, lira (hurdy-gurdy). Several of his songs were adapted for lute or torban by Roman Turovsky.

Аwards

1992 
Winner of International Festival of Author's Song "Bili Vitryla"

1991 
All Ukrainian Festival of Author's Song "Oberih", winner of The First Winning Award

1989 
All Ukrainian Festival Chervona Ruta, Chernivtsi (1-st Winning Award in song poetry)

1988 
Ukrainian Republican Festival of Author's Song in Kiev (?-st award).

Winner of Ukrainian Republican TV-Radio festival "New Names"

1987 
Festival of Author's Song of Ukraine and Moldavia, Kharkiv

1983 
Diploma of All soviet jazz-festival "Jazz on Dneper-river" (in a staff of Ranok group, Dnipropetrovsk)

Bibliography
 "CATHARSIS", songtexts and poems. "Smoloskyp" 2007.

Discography
 CD "Dvom dusham Darujet'sia" – "A Gift For Two Souls" – 2005.
 "Songs of The Orange Revolution".
 "Tales of Lirnyk Sashko"
  Kiev Kobzar Guild CD – "The One who Firmly Relies Upon God"
 "Nebo Ukrainy", CD-"Same Tak”
 "The Songs Of The Land of The Cossaks" – 1995 Zen Records & Nerve TM, Toronto, Ontario, Canada.

References

https://web.archive.org/web/20071212061005/http://users.i.com.ua/~drachedw/
http://ceh.org.ua/dra4.htm

See also
Musical historicism

1965 births
Living people
Composers for lute
Historicist composers
Kobzars
People from Kryvyi Rih
People of the Revolution on Granite
Torbanists
Ukrainian composers
Ukrainian lutenists